Franklin Township is one of the eighteen townships of Columbiana County, Ohio, United States. The 2010 census reported 835 people living in the township, 700 of whom lived in the unincorporated portions of the township.

Geography
Located in the southwestern part of the county, it borders the following townships:
Center Township - northeast
Wayne Township - east
Washington Township - southeast
Fox Township, Carroll County - southwest
East Township, Carroll County - west
Hanover Township - northwest

One village is located in Franklin Township:
The village of Summitville, in the west

Name and history

It is one of twenty-one Franklin Townships statewide.
The township was organized in 1816.

Government
The township is governed by a three-member board of trustees, who are elected in November of odd-numbered years to a four-year term beginning on the following January 1. Two are elected in the year after the presidential election and one is elected in the year before it. There is also an elected township fiscal officer, who serves a four-year term beginning on April 1 of the year after the election, which is held in November of the year before the presidential election. Vacancies in the fiscal officership or on the board of trustees are filled by the remaining trustees.

Township Trustees
Joe Medure, Chairman
Mike Lutz, Vice Chairman
Mike Johnson

Fiscal Officer
Britnie Baker

References

External links
County website

Townships in Columbiana County, Ohio
1816 establishments in Ohio
Populated places established in 1816
Townships in Ohio